When We Go to War is a 2015 television drama miniseries from New Zealand. The series uses fictional characters to depict the impact of the First World War on New Zealanders at home as well as in the New Zealand Expeditionary Force during the Gallipoli Campaign and in Egypt.

The series premiered in 2015, the centenary year of Gallipoli, with its first two episodes aired together during the ANZAC day holiday weekend.

The six one-hour episodes were commissioned and broadcast by TVNZ.

Episodes

References

External links 
 

2010s New Zealand television series
2015 in New Zealand television
Television shows funded by NZ on Air